Frederik Christiaan Woudhuizen (Zutphen, 13 February 1959 – Heiloo, 28 September 2021) was a Dutch independent scholar who studied ancient Indo-European languages, hieroglyphic Luvian/Luwian, and Mediterranean protohistory. He was the former editor of Talanta, Proceedings of the Dutch Archaeological and Historical Society.

Life
Fred Woudhuizen graduated from high school in 1977. He finished his history studies in 1985 with an exam in Ancient History and specializing in Prehistory and Early History of the Mediterranean region. His education included Provincial Roman Archeology and the study of Classical languages, including Latin and Greek, as well as Luwian languages, Italian dialects and Mycenaeology. In 2006 he obtained his doctorate from Erasmus University Rotterdam with a Dissertation on The Ethnicity of the Sea Peoples. From 1986 to 1989 and 1992 to 1995 Woudhuizen was editor of the Dutch journal Talanta, Proceedings of the Dutch Archaeological and Historical Society and from 1990 to 1992 director of the “Henri Frankfort Foundation”.

Work
Woudhuizen examined in particular the writing systems of the Late Bronze Age and Early Iron Age of the Mediterranean, including Luwian hieroglyphs, Cretan hieroglyphs, Linear A, Cypro-Minoan and the Byblos Script. He has also dealt extensively with the Luwian language and with "Trümmersprachen" (Lycian, Lydian, Sidetic, Carian) and investigated Etruscan and Southwest Iberian. Woudhuizen applied a methodical principle to his work, which Stefan Hiller describes as a “paleographic-comparative procedure”. A similar approach had been used by Michael Ventris in the deciphering of Linear B. Similar or comparable character forms in related writing systems are used and their known phonetic values are transferred to the script to be deciphered. Woudhuizen described the most difficult part of his deciphering work as “hunting for sound values”. If the character sequence of the writing to be deciphered can be translated into a sequence of phonetic values, the writing becomes legible. In order to make them understandable, word parallels in other languages must be used. Due to the close relationship of the language branches within the Indo-European language family, the meaning of some terms is obvious.

Until 2008, Woudhuizen worked for two decades jointly with Jan Best, at that time a lecturer in Ancient History and Prehistory at the  University of Amsterdam. Best had deciphered the libation formula in Linear A in 1981: “I have given and my hand has made as an expiatory offering, oh Asherah.” According to his studies, this sentence showed that it is a Semitic language, which was written in a linearized script derived essentially from the Cretan hieroglyphs. Woudhuizen continued this work on his own from 2009, mainly transferring the phonetic values from the later Linear B to the signs of Linear A. He then identified the words using a Semitic dictionary – and was thus able to read Linear A. According to Woudhuizen, the language of the Linear A tablets is identical to the Semitic dialect that was spoken in Byblos at the same time.

The deciphering of Linear A triggered a domino effect, because the transfer of phonetic values between similar characters in different writing systems also made other scripts that were previously considered undeciphered readable, including the Byblos Script and Cypro-Minoan. According to Woudhuizen, the situation on Crete, with regard to languages and scripts, was complicated, as in addition to Semitic, Luwian and Pelasgian were also spoken and written on the island. The Luwian language turned out to be particularly helpful in deciphering Cretan hieroglyphs, the longest text of which, according to Woudhuizen, is the famous Phaistos Disc.
 
Woudhuizen's works show that characters, scripts and languages of the 2nd millennium BC were largely derived from one another across the entire Mediterranean region. With regard to the transcription of Luwian hieroglyphs, Woudhuizen insisted that the sound values of the Luwian language, which are known for around 90 percent of the words, ought to be used. The standard method for transcription, as established in 1973, however, uses Latin terms. The well-known Luwian word “parna” (for house) is therefore transcribed with the Latin term “DOMUS”. Woudhuizen argued that the translation into Latin hinders access to the Luwian language, thus making it unnecessarily difficult to understand. He also assumed a position against the so-called “new reading” advocated by  J. David Hawkins and suggested replacing this with an “adapted old reading”.

Woudhuizen’s arguments have been confirmed by the subsequent studies in a number of instances:

 Since the 1980s, Woudhuizen has argued that the coming of the Greeks should be placed around 1600 BC. Historian Robert Drews, in his work, The Coming of the Greeks, seems to agree with this late date.

 Woudhuizen argued that Luwian has to be centum like all other Early Indo-European languages. This suggestion was accepted by Craig Melchert in 2012.

 According to Woudhuizen, Luwian hieroglyphic came into use as early as 2000 BC, and Willemijn Waal in a 2012 paper confirmed the existence of Middle Bronze Age Luwian inscriptions.
 
 The word tíwaná occurs frequently in the Late Bronze Age Luwian hieroglyphic inscriptions from Yalburt and Südburg. Already in the 1990s, Woudhuizen interpreted this word to represent “enemy,” which helped understanding the texts much better. This interpretation was later confirmed by Ilya Yakubovich.
 
 Piero Meriggi in 1964 read the sequence ma-sà-ka-na- as “Phrygians” in Kızıldağ 4 – and Woudhuizen was the only scholar who maintained this identification ever since. In 2019, the word “Muski” turned up in the Türkmen-Karahöyük inscription and was then interpreted to mean “Phrygian” – as it does in Kızıldağ 4.
 
 The Tuscany Dice bears the Etruscan words for the digits 1-6, where θu has been read as “one” and zal as “two”. Woudhuizen suggested swapping the numbers so that θu stands for “two” and is thus typically Indo-European. This interpretation was later adopted by John Ray.
 
 In the late 1990s, Woudhuizen suggested that Southwestern Iberian is Celtic – an idea subsequently advocated by John Koch.

Selected publications
 Luwian hieroglyphic monumental rock and stone inscriptions from the Hittite Empire period
 Selected Luwian hieroglyphic texts 1
 Selected Luwian hieroglyphic texts 2
 Selected Luwian hieroglyphic texts, the extended version
 The earliest Cretan scripts
 The earliest Cretan scripts 2
 The Phaistos Disc: A Luwian letter to Nestor
 The ethnicity of the Sea Peoples
 Ethnicity in Mediterranean Protohistory, with Wim M.J. van Binsbergen
 Some More Etruscan Inscriptions
 Two Notes on Lydian
 Etruscan as a colonial Luwian language, Amsterdam 2019
 The Liber Linteus

References

External links

1959 births
2021 deaths
Independent scholars
20th-century Dutch historians
People from Zutphen
Dutch philologists
Erasmus University Rotterdam alumni
Luwian language
21st-century Dutch historians